Guru Jambheshwar, also known as Guru Jamboji, (1451–1536) was the founder of the Bishnoi Panth. He taught that God is a divine power that is everywhere. He also taught to protect plants and animals as they are important in order to peacefully co-exist with nature.

Biography
Jambheshwar ji was born in a family of the Panwar/Parmar Rajput clan in the village of Pipasar, Nagaur district in 1451. He was the only child of Lohat Panwar and Hansa Devi. For the first seven years of his life, Guru Jambeshwar was considered silent and introverted. He spent 27 years of his life as a cow herder.

Founding Bishnoi Panth 
Aged 34, Guru Jambheshwar founded the Bishnoi sub-sect of Vaishnavism at Samrathal Dhora. His teachings were in the poetic form known as Shabadwani. He preached for the next 51 years, travelling across the country, and produced 120 Shabads, or verses, of Shabadwani. The sect was founded after the big draught in Rajasthan in 1485. He had laid down 29 principles to be followed by the sect. Killing animals and felling trees were banned. The Khejri tree (Prosopis cineraria), is also considered to be sacred by the Bishnois.

Bishnoi panth revolves around 29 rules. Of these, eight prescribe to preserve biodiversity and encourage good animal husbandry, seven provide directions for healthy social behaviour, and ten are directed towards personal hygiene and maintaining basic good health. The other four commandments provide guidelines for worshipping Vishnu daily.

Legacy and commemoration
The Bishnoi have various temples, of which they consider the most holy to be "Mukam Mukti Dham" in the village of Mukam in Nokha tehsil, Bikaner district, Rajasthan. It is there where the most sacred Bishnoi temple is built over samadhi of Guru Jambeshwar. Guru Jambeshwar University of Science and Technology at Hisar in the state of Haryana is named after him.

See also
Bhakti movement
Chipko movement
Khejarli Massacre

References
12. about Guru Jambheshwar News29.co

Indian Hindu religious leaders
Indian environmentalists
Folk deities of Rajasthan
Hindu folk deities
Medieval Hindu religious leaders
1451 births
1536 deaths